The Club Atlético Patronato de la Juventud Católica (commonly called Patronato or Patronato de Paraná, lit. 'Patronage of Parana') is an Argentine football club based in Paraná, Entre Ríos. The squad will compete in the second-tier Primera Nacional, following their relegation from the Argentine Primera División in 2022.

History
The club debuted in Primera División in 1978, playing the Nacional championship. In December 2015, Patronato achieved its second promotion to Primera after defeating Santamarina de Tandil by penalty shoot-out. Patronato was relegated to the Primera Nacional in 2022, despite winning the 2021-22 Copa Argentina and qualifying for the Copa Libertadores group stage that same year.

Rivalries
The clubs with which it has a classic sporting rivalry are the Club Atlético Paraná, from the same city, with which they make up the "Paraná derby" and the Club Gimnasia y Esgrima from the city of Concepción del Uruguay, with which they make up the "Entre Ríos derby".

Players

Current squad
.

Out on loan

Honours

National 
Copa Argentina (1): 2021–22 
Torneo Argentino A (1): 2009–10
Torneo Argentino B (1): 2007-08

Regional 
 Torneo Regional (1): 1978

References

External links

 
Locos por Patronato
Patronato Digital

 
Football clubs in Entre Ríos Province
Association football clubs established in 1914
Club Atletico Patronato
Paraná, Entre Ríos